Weinlos is a residential neighbourhood located in the Mill Woods area of Edmonton, Alberta, Canada.

The community is represented by the Ridgewood Community League, established in 1982, which maintains a community hall and outdoor rink located at Mill Woods Road East and 37 Avenue.

Geography 
Weinlos is bounded on the west by 50 Street, on the east by Mill Woods Road East, on the north by 34 Avenue, and on the south by 23 Avenue.

Demographics 

Residential development 
The most common type of residence in the neighbourhood is the single-family dwelling (71% of residences) followed by apartments in low-rise buildings with fewer than five stories (21%), duplexes (5%) and row houses (2%).  Approximately two out of three residences (68%) are owner occupied with the remainder being rented. While some homes in the neighbourhood were constructed during the 1970s, most residential construction occurred during the 1980s.

Education 
There are two schools in the neighbourhood, Kate Chegwin Junior High School (Public) and Weinlos School (Public Kindergarten through Grade 6).

Surrounding neighbourhoods

See also 
 Edmonton Federation of Community Leagues

References

External links 
 Weinlos Neighbourhood Profile

Neighbourhoods in Edmonton